CATA, Cata or catá  may refer to:


People
Alfonso Catá (1937 – 1990), Cuban ballet dancer
Larry Catá Backer (born 1955), Cuban-American legal scholar
Cata Díaz (born 1979), Argentine footballer
El Cata, Dominican singer

Places
Cața, a commune in Braşov County, Romania
Bahía de Cata (Bay of Cata), Venezuela

Transport
Cape Ann Transportation Authority, Gloucester, Massachusetts
Capital Area Transportation Authority, Lansing, Michigan
Centre Area Transportation Authority, State College, Pennsylvania
CATA Línea Aérea, Argentine airline

Institutions
Canadian Athletic Therapists Association, Canadian professional body
Central Academy of Technology and Arts
Central Asian Treaty Alliance, a fictional alliance in the Project Reality modification for Battlefield 2

Other
Catá, Cuban percussion instrument
Mordella cata, species of beetle
Periploca cata, species of moth

See also
Catastrophe (disambiguation)